Puxley is a hamlet in the West Northamptonshire civil parish of Deanshanger. England.

Hamlets in Northamptonshire
West Northamptonshire District